Kátoly is a village in Baranya county, Hungary.

External links 
www.katoly.hu 

Populated places in Baranya County